Battery F, 1st Battalion Tennessee Light Artillery was an artillery battery that served in the Union Army during the American Civil War.

Service
The battalion was organized in Memphis, Nashville, and Knoxville, Tennessee, from June 13, 1863, through October 16, 1863, under the command of Lieutenant Colonel Robert Clay Crawford.

Battery F was attached to 1st Brigade, 4th Division, XXIII Corps, Department of the Ohio.

Battery F, 1st Battalion Tennessee Light Artillery presumably ceased to exist after April 13, 1864, when the battery's men were transferred to Battery A, 1st Battalion Tennessee Light Artillery.

See also

 List of Tennessee Civil War units
 Tennessee in the Civil War

References
 Dyer, Frederick H.  A Compendium of the War of the Rebellion (Des Moines, IA:  Dyer Pub. Co.), 1908.
Attribution

External links
 Brief unit history, including officers' names, regimental strengths, etc.

Military units and formations established in 1863
Military units and formations disestablished in 1864
Units and formations of the Union Army from Tennessee
1864 disestablishments in the United States
1863 establishments in Tennessee
Artillery units and formations of the American Civil War